The Thylacocephala (from the Greek  or , meaning "pouch", and  or  meaning "head") are group of extinct probable mandibulate arthropods, that have been considered by some researchers as having possible crustacean affinities. As a class they have a short research history, having been erected in the early 1980s.

They typically possess a large, laterally flattened carapace that encompasses the entire body. The compound eyes tend to be large and bulbous, and occupy a frontal notch on the carapace. They possess three pairs of large raptorial limbs, and the abdomen bears a battery of small swimming limbs.

Inconclusive claims of thylacocephalans have been reported from the lower lower Cambrian (Zhenghecaris), but later study considered that genus as radiodont or arthropod with uncertain systematic position. The oldest unequivocal fossils are Upper Ordovician and Lower Silurian in age. As a group, the Thylacocephala survived to the Santonian stage of the Upper Cretaceous, around 84 million years ago.

Beyond this, there remains much uncertainty concerning fundamental aspects of the thylacocephalan anatomy, mode of life, and relationship to the Crustacea, with whom they have always been cautiously aligned.

Research history
 
The Thylacocephala is only recently described as a class, yet species now included within the group were first described at the turn of the century. These were typically assigned to the phyllocarids despite an apparent lack of abdomen and appendages. In 1982/83, three research groups independently created higher taxa to accommodate new species. Based on a specimen from northern Italy, Pinna et al. designated a new class, Thylacocephala, while Secrétan – studying Dollocaris ingens, a species from the La Voulte-sur-Rhône konservat-lagerstätte in France – erected the class Conchyliocarida. Briggs & Rolfe, working on fossils from Australia's Devonian deposits were unable to attribute certain specimens to a known group, and created an order of uncertain affinities, the Concavicarida, to accommodate them. It was apparent the three groups were in fact working on a single major taxon (Rolfe noted disagreements over interpretation and taxonomic placement largely resulted from a disparity of sizes and differences in preservation.) The group took the name  Thylacocephala by priority, with  Concavicarida and Conchyliocarida subjugated to orders, erected by Rolfe, and modified by Schram.

Taxonomy
 
Researchers agree the Thylacocephala represent a class. Some efforts have been made at further classification: Schram split currently known taxa into two orders:
Concavicarida Briggs & Rolfe, 1983 which possesses:
A large, well developed optic notch
A discrete compound eye
 A fused rostrum
 8 to 16 homologous well-demarcated trunk segments diminishing in height anteriorly and posteriorly
 Order includes Ainiktozoon (Silurian), Harrycaris (Devonian), Concavicaris (Devonian to Carboniferous), Dollocaris (Jurassic).
Conchyliocarida Secrétan, 1983:
 Lacks an optic notch
 Eyes on a protruding sac-like cephalon
 No rostrum.
 Order includes Convexicaris (Carboniferous), Yangzicaris (Triassic), and Atropicaris, Austriocaris, Clausocaris, Kilianocaris, Ostenocaris, and Paraostenia from the Jurassic.

The accuracy of this scheme has been questioned in recent papers, as it stresses differences in the eyes and exoskeletal structure, which – in modern arthropods – tend to be a response to environmental conditions. Thus it has been suggested these features are too strongly controlled by external factors to be used alone to distinguish higher taxa. The problem is exacerbated by the limited number of thylacocephalan species known. More reliable anatomical indicators would include segmentation and appendage attachments (requiring the internal anatomy, currently elusive as a result of the carapace).

Anatomy 
Based on Vannier, modified after Schram:
The Thylacocephala are bivalved arthropods with morphology exemplified by three pairs of long raptorial (predatory) appendages and hypertrophied eyes. They have a worldwide distribution. A laterally compressed, shield−like carapace encloses the entire body, and often has an anterior rostrum−notch complex and posterior rostrum. Its lateral surface can be externally ornamented, and evenly convex or with longitudinal ridges. Spherical or drop-shaped eyes are situated in the optic notches, and are often hypertrophied, filling the notches or forming a paired, frontal globular structure. No prominent abdominal features emerge from the carapace, and the cephalon is obscured. Even so, some authors have suggested the presence of five cephalic appendages, three of which could be the very long genticulate and chelate raptorials protruding beyond the ventral margin. Alternatively these could originate from three anterior trunk segments. The posterior trunk has a series of eight to twenty styliform, filamentous pleopod-like appendages, decreasing in size posteriorly. Most Thylacocephala have eight pairs of well developed gills, found in the trunk region.

Beyond this there is a lack of knowledge about even basic thylacocephalan anatomy, including the number of posterior segments, origin of the raptorials, number of cephalic appendages, shape and attachment of gills, character of mouth, stomach and gut. This results from the class's all–encompassing carapace, which prevents the study of their internal anatomy in fossils.

Affinities 
It is universally accepted that the Thylacocephala are arthropods, yet the position within this phylum is debated. It had formerly been cautiously assumed that the class was a member of the Crustacea, but no conclusive proof exists. The strongest apomorphy aligning the class with other crustaceans is the carapace. As this feature has evolved independently numerous times within the Crustacea and other arthropods, it is not a very reliable pointer, and such evidence alone remains insufficient to align the class with the crustaceans.

Of the features which could prove crustacean affinities, the arrangement of mouthparts would be the easiest to find in the Thylacocephala. The literature features some mention of such a head arrangement, but none definitive. Schram reports the discovery of mandibles in the Mazon Creek thylacocephalan Concavicaris georgeorum. Secrétan also mentions – with caution – possible mandibles in serial sections of Dollocaris ingens, and traces of small limbs in the cephalic region (not well preserved enough to assess their identity). Lange et al. report a new genus and species, Thylacocephalus cymolopos, from the Upper Cretaceous of Lebanon, which has two possible pairs of antennae, but note the possession of two pairs of antennae alone does not prove the class occupies a position in the crown-group Crustacea.

Despite a lack of evidence for a crustacean body plan, several authors have aligned the class with different groups of crustaceans. Schram provides an overview of possible affinities:
Nothing in either Uniramia or Cheliceriformes seems likely.
Conchostraca is possible, but there is no strong supporting evidence.
A maxillopodan connection is possible. Largely considered due to the Italian researchers' insistence (see disagreements).
Stomatopods show many parallels but have no comparison to cephalon or body regions.
Remipedes show some parallels.
Decapod-like gills suggest malacostracan affinities.
In these various interpretations, numerous different limb arrangements for the three raptorials have been proposed:
antennules, antennae and mandibles
antennules, antennae and maxillipeds
thoracic (in keeping with stromatopod analogies)
maxillules, maxillae, maxillipedes
Further work is necessary to provide any solid conclusions.

A study in 2022 describing a new arthropod from Wisconsin, Acheronauta, found that the Thylacocephalans occupied a position more primitive than the crustaceans and myriapods as basal stem-group mandibulates. This would place them outside of the crustaceans as a more basal branch of the arthropod family tree.

This cladogram represents the placement of the Thylacocephalans within the arthropoda as suggested by Pulsipher, 2022.

Disagreements
Numerous conflicts of opinion surround the Thylacocephala, of which the split between the “Italian school” and rest of the world is the most notable. Based on poorly preserved Ostenocaris cypriformis fossils from the Osteno deposits of Lombardy, Pinna et al. erected the class Thylacocephala. Based on inferred cirripede affinities the authors concluded the frontal lobed structure was not an eye, but a 'cephalic sac'. This opinion arose from the misinterpretation of the stomach as a reproductive organ (its contents included vertebral elements of fish, thought to be ovarian eggs). Such an arrangement is reminiscent of cirripede crustaceans, leading the authors to suggest a sessile, filter feeding mode of life, the 'cephalic sac' used to anchor the organism to the seabed. The researchers have since conceded it is highly improbable the ovaries are situated in the head, but maintain that the frontal structure is not an eye. Instead they suggest the 'cephalic sac' is covered with microsclerites, their arguments most recently presented in Alessandrello et al.
The structure is complex and "presumably multipurpose"
“Apart from a few features” it shows little affinity with a compound eye
There is a close connection with stomach residues, sac muscular system and outer hexagonal layer
Having a stomach between the eyes is unusual
Sclerites that should correspond to rhabdoms in 'eye theory' are interstitial to the hexagons, not at centre as would be expected for individual ommatidium.
Structural analogy with cirriped peduncle

Instead the authors suggest the sac is used to break down coarse chunks of food and reject indigestible portions.

All other parties interpret this as a large compound eye, the hexagons being preserved ommatidia (all researchers agree these are the same structure). This is supported by fossils of Dollocaris ingens which are so well preserved that individual retinula cells can be discerned. The preservation is so exceptional that studies have shown the species' numerous small ommatidia, distributed over the large eyes, could reduce the angle between ommatidia, thus improve their ability to detect small objects. Of the arguments above, it is posited by opponents that eyes are complex structures, and those in the Thylacocephala display clear and numerous affinities with compound eyes in other arthropod fossils, down to a cellular level of detail. The 'cephalic sac' structure itself is poorly preserved in Osteno specimens, a possible reason for interstitial 'sclerites'. The structural analogy with a cirripede peduncle lost supporting evidence when the 'ovaries' were shown to be alimentary residues, and the sac muscular system could be used to support the eyes. The unusual position of the stomach is thus the strongest inconsistency, but the Thylacocephala are defined by their unusual features, so this is not inconceivable. Further, Rolfe suggests the eyes' position can be explained if they have a large posterior area of attachment, while Schram suggests that the stomach region extending into the cephalic sac could result from an inflated foregut or anteriorly directed caecum.

Discussion of the matter has ceased in the last decade, and most researchers accept the anterior structure is an eye. Confusion is most likely the result of differing preservation in Osteno.

Mode of life

Numerous modes of life have been suggested for the Thylacocephala.

Secrétan suggested Dollocaris ingens was too large to swim, so inferred a predatory 'lurking' mode of life, lying in wait on the sea bed and then springing out to capture prey. The author also suggested it could be necrophagous, supported by Alessandrello et al., who suggest they would have been incapable of directly killing the shark remains found in the Osteno specimens' alimentary residues. Instead they surmise the  Thylacocephala could have ingested shark vomit which included such remains.

Vannier et al. note the Thylacocephala possess features which would suggest adaptations for swimming in dim-light environments – a thin, non-mineralized carapace, well-developed rostral spines for possible buoyancy control in some species, a battery of pleopods for swimming, and large prominent eyes. This is supported by the Cretaceous species from Lebanon, which show adaptations for swimming, and possibly schooling.

Rolfe provides many possibilities, but concludes a realistic mode of life is mesopelagic, by analogy with hyperiid amphipods. Further suggests floor-dwelling is also possible, and that the organism could rise to catch prey during the day and return to the sea floor at night. Another notable proposal is that, like hyperiids, the class could gain oil from their food source for buoyancy, an idea supported by their diet (known from stomach residues containing shark and coleoid remains, and other Thylacocephala).

Alessandrello et al. suggest a head-down, semi-sessile life on a soft bottom, in agreement with that of Pinna et al., based on cirripede affinities. A necrophagous diet is suggested.

Briggs & Rolfe report that all the Gogo formation Thylacocephala are found in a reef formation, suggesting a shallow water environment. The authors speculate that due to the terracing of the carapace an infaunal mode of life is possible, or the ridges could provide more friction for hiding in crevices of rock.

Schram suggests a dichotomy in size of the class results from different environments; larger Thylacocephala could have lived in a fluid characterized by turbulent flow, and relied on single power stroke of trunk limbs to position themselves. He suggests that smaller forms may have resided in a viscous medium, characterized by laminar flow, and used a lever to generate the speed necessary to capture prey.

References

 
Prehistoric crustaceans
Arthropod classes
Prehistoric protostome classes
Cambrian first appearances
Late Cretaceous extinctions